, also known as , is a fictional character in the One Piece franchise created by Eiichiro Oda.

A native to the North Blue, Sanji grew up as part of the Vinsmoke family under his father Vinsmoke Judge, king of the Germa Kingdom, and mother Vinsmoke Sora. Living under a grueling father who only saw Sanji as a soldier, he escapes to Baratie where he learns to cook under “Red Leg” Zeff and learns his fighting style, which is characterized by the use of legs in combat. Sanji is the fifth member and the fourth to join Monkey D. Luffy’s pirate crew as cook after the battle against Don Krieg.

Creation and conception
Early designs show that originally, Sanji was going to be a gun wielding black haired character named Naruto but that idea was scrapped. 

Oda was inspired by Mr. Pink, Steve Buscemi's character in Reservoir Dogs (1992), when creating Sanji.

Design
Sanji is a tall, slender man who commonly wears a black suit and smokes a cigarette. Before the timeskip, Sanji is seen with his blonde hair covering his right eye; however, after the timeskip, his hair covers his left eye. Before leaving his family, Sanji styled his hair in the opposite direction and wore a yellow shirt with a black number three on it. He also wore white pants, brown boots, and a yellow bandana. After leaving his family and still a child, he started wearing a white cook’s uniform. Sanji grows a goatee during the timeskip, and concept art shows this was his original design.

Sanji's most distinctive feature is his eyebrows, which are characterized as swirls with the tail end pointing at his left side, opposite in direction in comparison to his siblings Ichiji, Niji, Yonji, and Reiju. 

Oda revealed Sanji's real-world nationality would be a Frenchman, in contrast to the Nazi Germany themes of Germa 66.

Personality
Sanji is mostly seen as a composed, nonchalant, and calm individual who always keeps his cool when in dire situations. However, this is contrasted by the many comedic gags he partakes in, such as when in the presence of a lady or when insulted by a crew member. Most notably, Sanji and Zoro have a great rivalry, often resorting to fighting (both verbally and physically). However, even when engaging in discourse, they still find ways to help their crew and those around them, such as when they inadvertently save Toko from death.

Sanji is also known to have an enamored personality, constantly flirting with any attractive female he sees, earning him the nickname "ero-cook". Many fans want him to be with Nami. Even as a child, while working in Baratie, Sanji would become love-struck with attractive female customers and end up making mistakes in the process of cooking. He also shows jealousy towards those that he perceives to be luckier than him with women, such as when he sees Zoro with Hiyori. Despite this nature, Sanji exhibits some self-restraint due to his loyalty to his crew, as is shown by the fact that in spite of being attracted to Pudding, he sternly refused to marry her and decided to let her down gently. Moreover, due to this attitude and the multiple lectures from Zeff, Sanji follows his own strict set of personal morals in the form of chivalry. He has sworn to never attack women or let them be insulted, even at the cost of his own life and has gone so far as to only block against Kalifa, one of the main antagonists of the Water Seven arc, until Nami could help him. However Sanji did not ask for help — after growing up with an abusive biological father who never heeded his cries for help, Sanji never asks for help during the present-day series until the Wano Arc, where he asks Nico Robin to save him from a woman antagonist who he refuses to help. This is due to the greater vulnerability and acceptance of himself after Luffy saves him from an arranged marriage during the Whole Cake Island Arc.

Sanji is kind and often saves others in danger, even at the cost of his own safety. Oftentimes he frames this kindhearted nature as mere chivalry towards women, but in his actions he consistently helps men as well. Having suffered from starvation among the litany of abuse put upon him by his father, he never denies a person a meal regardless of their intentions, as shown when Don Krieg attempted to take over the Baratie during his introductory arc. Frequently during the series he separates himself from everyone else to play a clandestine role which subsequently helps the crew and other allies survive. In Water 7, Sanji separates from the crew and finds Nico Robin boarding the Puffing Tom on its way to Enies Lobby for her execution. In Thriller Bark, he offers to give up his life in exchange for Luffy's. In Zou, Sanji decided to leave the crew in order to confront his family and protect the Straw Hats from the Fire Tank Pirates. In Wano, Sanji asks for help from another for the first time when asks Robin to save him.

Voice actors

In the original Japanese version of the One Piece anime series, Sanji is voiced by Hiroaki Hirata as an adult and Ikue Ōtani as a child.

In Odex's dubs of the first 104 episodes of One Piece in Singapore, Sanji was voiced by Joseph Murray and Paul Pistore. In the 4kids Entertainment's dub of the first 104 episodes of One Piece, Sanji was voiced by David Moo as an adult and by Veronica Taylor as a child. In Funimation Entertainment's dubs of the entire One Piece franchise, adult Sanji is voiced by Eric Vale with Christen Auten playing the role of child Sanji.

Abilities
When fighting, Sanji only ever relies on kicks, never punching opponents because of his belief that a cook's hands are important instruments for their craft, and thus must be protected from harm. Over the course of the series, Sanji utilizes attacks that are variations of kicks (deemed “Black Leg Style”), with the name of the attack usually having something to do with food, such as “Diable Jambe,” wherein he raises the temperatures of his legs so high that they glow bright red. During his time on Momoiro Island, Sanji learns a move named “Sky Walk,” which allows him to jump to great heights and to be able to float mid air by making sonic booms in the air behind him. Sanji is one of the few high-bounty individuals that has not consumed a Devil Fruit, fruits that give the consumer superhuman powers at the expense of becoming a dead weight in water. After Whole Cake Island, Sanji receives a Raid Suit gifted from Germa 66, the underground organization powering Germa Kingdom, which increases his physical capabilities and allows him to blend in with his environment.

Other than fighting skills, Sanji is also a well-renowned cook. He learned to cook under Zeff on the Baratie and has become quick and dexterous in his ability to use knives. He also has a strong sense of taste and smell, which is seen by being able to deduce the ingredients and being able to recreate the wedding cake on Whole Cake Island.

Haki
During the timeskip, he develops Observation Haki, which allows him to sense the intent and presence of others, such as when he was able to dodge a jelly bean bullet from Katakuri. He is also able to utilize Armament Haki, which allows him to harden parts of his body and be able to attack Logia users.

Appearances

One Piece manga
Born as a prince of Germa Kingdom, a floating kingdom composed of several ships on the shells of large snails,  is routinely ridiculed by his genetically enhanced sociopathic siblings and is locked away by his father Judge for being a disgrace. His appeals for help are met with disdain from Judge. With help from his sister Reiju, he escapes and flees Germa. On his way out, Sanji encounters his father, who tells him that if he is to run away, he must never tell anyone of his relation to the Germa, feeling shameful about their connection. Sanji eventually flees on a cruise ship known as the Orbit.

While serving as an apprentice cook on a passenger ship, nine-year-old Sanji stands up to a boarding party of pirates led by the infamous "Red Foot" Zeff. During the encounter, Sanji is swept into the sea by a massive wave. While castaways together, the pirate saves Sanji's life yet again by giving him all of their food. Zeff in turn makes him a first-rate cook and teaches him his kick-based fighting style. Mirroring Zeff, Sanji will never refuse a starving person a meal, and he uses only his legs when fighting to protect the hands he needs for cooking. He has a weakness for women and makes it a principle never to harm one, even if it means his death.

In Thriller Bark, he offers to give up his life in exchange for Luffy's. In Zou, Sanji is forced into an arranged marriage with the daughter of Big Mom, one of the Four Emperors. Sanji decides to leave the crew in order to confront his family and protect the Straw Hats from the Big Mom Pirates. However Luffy invades the Big Mom Pirates' Empire to save Sanji, but Sanji is unwilling to let his family, though he despises them, die in a trap laid out by Big Mom, who seeks their powerful technology. Luffy responds by acknowledging that such kindness is the heart of Sanji's character. Together they manage to save Sanji's family and escape Big Mom, earning bounty increases. Sanji is pleased that his bounty exceed's Zoro's, but angered at the inclusion of his surname in the poster. Sanji is also displeased to receive his own technologically-enhanced Raid Suit from his family which grants him the ability to turn invisible.

In Wano, Sanji asks for help from another for the first time when asks Robin to save him from a woman enemy he is unwilling to fight. This is the first time Sanji asks for help in the present-day series from someone else. Later he realizes using the Raid Suit began to awaken dormant genetic enhancements that his mother suppressed years ago. He had gained an exoskeleton, a superhuman physical constitution, accelerated healing, increase in strength and speed which enhanced his fighting style immensely and his skin has become bulletproof. Sadly, this had dampened his emotions as well when he realized he had hurt a woman unknowingly who unintentionally got his way and became extremely afraid of him but that was not the case, as it is confirmed by Sanji, that Queen used his invisibility to make it look like he did the beating. Fearing he is losing his heart and humanity, he destroys the Raid Suit canister, freeing himself from Germa's influence for good and stopping him from losing more of himself.

In other media
The creators of Food Wars, Yūto Tsukuda and Shun Saeki, created a set of spinoff one-shots titled Shokugeki no Sanji, with the first installment being published in 2018 to celebrate One Piece’s 21st anniversary. There are currently four installments and the spinoffs are short stories detailing different cooking competitions that Sanji partakes in, as well as going into detail about his training in Okama Island.

A cookbook titled One Piece: Pirate Recipes was published by Shueisha in November 2012. The book is attributed to Sanji himself and includes various  One Piece-themed cooking recipes. A localization by Viz Media was announced in February 2021, and released on November 23, 2021.

Sanji has also been featured in varying forms of merchandise. For instance, many figurines have been produced, with one example being the Sanji figure in the One Piece Locations Trading Figures series. In 2012, the French Luxury brand S.T Dupont collaborated on their 140th anniversary with Eiichiro Oda to recreate Sanji's iconic "Sleeping Mermaid" gold lighter.

Statues have also been erected in Sanji's honor. A bronze statue of Sanji was dedicated in Mashiki, Kumamoto as part of the Kumamoto Revival Project to help with healing after the 2016 earthquakes in the area. In the Nagoya location of the One Piece Mugiwara Store, a statue of Sanji stands next to artwork from the show. In "Sanji's Oresama Restaurant," one of the Tokyo One Piece Tower's restaurants, a statue of Sanji can be seen as part of a feast with the rest of the crew.

Sanji will be portrayed by Taz Skylar in Netflix's live action adaptation of One Piece.

Reception

Popularity
In the Shōnen Jump One Piece popularity polls, Sanji was ranked fourth in the first poll (1999) and third for the three subsequent polls (2002, 2006, 2009). In the most recent poll (2021), which was the first polled held worldwide, Sanji was ranked the fourth most popular character with 970,286 votes.

Critical response
Dyler Crews wrote how “Sanji has all of the tangibles to be one of the undisputed best characters in the entire series. His origin, powers, and style make him an easy favorite among One Piece fans. Still, his strange obsession with women pushes other fans away. The lecherous hero is as foundational to the shonen manga genre as gaudy transformations. Sanji is the most visible in a long line of problematic and confounding characters to express this annoyingly immature personality type.” 

Eric Vale’s work with Sanji nominated him for the “Voice Actor of the Year” award in the Behind the Voice Actor Awards from 2015. Daniel Dockery, a senior staff writer for Crunchyroll, argued that Sanji has one of the best character introductions in anime. Ritwik Mitra of GameRant placed Sanji as the best comedy relief character in shōnen anime, citing his attempts at courting women and conflicts with his crew mate Roronoa Zoro as a source of humor. Mitra adds that Sanji is also a significant part in "some of the most iconic non-comedy moments", which he believes to be reason for his popularity.

Further reading

References

Anime and manga characters who can move at superhuman speeds
Anime and manga characters with superhuman strength
Comics characters introduced in 1998
Fictional characters who can turn invisible
Fictional chefs
Fictional genetically engineered characters
Fictional sea pirates
Fictional princes
Male characters in anime and manga
Martial artist characters in anime and manga
One Piece characters
Teenage characters in anime and manga